Vequist (foaled February 6, 2018) is an American National Champion Thoroughbred racemare who won the 2020 Spinaway Stakes and Breeders' Cup Juvenile Fillies.

Racing career

2020: Two-Year-Old Season
Vequist came second in her debut on July 29 at Parx Racetrack. She then won the Spinaway Stakes on September 6. She entered the race with 6:1 odds and won by 1 and 1/2 lengths over Esplanande.

On October 10, she came second in the Frizette Stakes. She came into the race as the favorite at 4:5 odds but lost to Dayoutoftheoffice by 2 lengths.

On November 6, Vequist won the Breeders' Cup Juvenile Fillies. She was the 4th favorite for the race and won by 2 lengths over Dayoutoftheoffice.

Vequist was named American Champion Two-Year-Old Filly for 2020.

2021: Three-Year-Old Season
Vequist made her first start of 2021 in the Davona Dale Stakes. She raced mid-pack, but jockey Irad Ortiz Jr. knew she didn't have the same kick that she had in the Juvenile Fillies and he eased her to a ninth place finish. An endoscopic examination after the race showed that Vequist had considerable congestion in her lungs.

The next goal was the Kentucky Oaks, but trainer Robert “Butch” Reid said that Vequist wasn't ready for that race and they would aim for the Alabama Stakes instead, with long term goals being the Cotillion Stakes and Breeders' Cup.

Vequist was retired her racing career while Spendthrift Farm purchased in Fasig-Tipton November Sale.

Pedigree

References

2018 racehorse births
Breeders' Cup Juvenile Fillies winners
Racehorses bred in the United States
Racehorses trained in the United States